Joris Pieters van den Broeck (1610 – 27 August 1652) was a Frisian sailor in the service of the Admiralty of Friesland.

Service
In the days before the Battle of the Downs, Maarten Harpertszoon Tromp had chosen a position off the coast near Dunkirk. De Broeck was one of his captains on this occasion, commanding the 67-man, 10-gun Frisian roeifregat Rotterdam, and he was sent by Tromp to investigate the Spanish fleet reported at La Coruña. On receiving Broeck's report on it, Tromp decided to attack and in the ensuing battle Broeck was sent to Calais to bring back new supplies of gunpowder to the Dutch fleet.  Having done so, Broeck rejoined the fleet and managed to capture a 140-man 18-gun Spanish galleon.

On 18 October 1640 he captured an 8-gun 72-man Dunkirker frigate and sail it back into Dokkum, followed in May 1642 by his capture of some small Dunkirker vessels and an 80-man 12-gun Dunkirker frigate. In August 1642 he forced a 14-gun enemy frigate to run aground and captured a 140-man 20-gun frigate. In the battle of Plymouth on 26 August 1652 he commanded the De Westergo in the squadron of Michiel de Ruyter (and was, apart from de Ruyter, the highest-ranking officer present), but he died in the evening after the battle of disease.

1610 births
1652 deaths
Dutch naval personnel of the Anglo-Dutch Wars
Dutch sailors
People from Friesland